The alpine shrew (Sorex alpinus) is a species of mammal in the family Soricidae. It is found in the alpine meadows and coniferous forests of central and southern European mountain ranges.

Description
It is a uniform greyish-black on its dorsal (upper) surface and greyish-brown on its underparts. The tips of its teeth are reddish-brown and it has a long pointed snout, small black eyes and rounded pink ears. Its legs and feet are white and the underside of its hairy tail is yellowish. Juveniles are somewhat paler than adults. It shares its range with the common shrew Sorex araneus and the Eurasian pygmy shrew Sorex minutus but is distinguishable from these by its darker fur and longer tail.

Distribution and habitat
The Alpine shrew is found in the mountains and uplands of Central and Eastern Europe and parts of France. Its range includes the Alps, the Black Forest, the Jura Mountains, the mountains of southern Germany, the Krkonoše, the Beskids, the Tatra Mountains, the Carpathian Mountains, the Transylvanian Alps, the uplands of Vosges and the mountains of the former Yugoslavia. It sometimes occurs above the tree line but more normally favours damp pastures and swampy ground near small streams in areas with dwarf sparse conifers near the upper limit of tree cover. It tends to lurk in dense vegetation, occupies rock crevices and lives under boulders or fallen branches and often occurs near mountain huts.

The Alpine shrew was recorded in the Spanish Pyrenees in the early 20th century. It is presumed locally extinct due to the lack of modern sightings.

Behaviour
The Alpine shrew is nocturnal and is a skilled climber, using its tail for balance. It uses scent glands on its flanks to mark its territory. Like other shrew species, it has a high metabolic rate and needs to feed frequently. It eats insects, spiders, snails and earthworms and is in turn the prey of foxes, weasels, domestic cats and tawny owls.

Status
The Alpine shrew is listed as "Near Threatened" in the IUCN's Red List of Threatened Species. This is because it occupies a number of separate, disjunct mountain regions and seems to be slowly declining in numbers. It may be threatened by habitat destruction as hydro-electric schemes and increased tourism impact its environment. It used to be present in the Pyrenees but has not been seen there for many years and may be extinct there, nor has it been seen recently in the Harz Mountain region of Germany.

References

Sorex
Mammals described in 1837
Taxonomy articles created by Polbot